Walsall (or ; locally ) is a large market town and administrative centre in West Midlands County, England. This list a list of notable people who were born in, lived in, or were otherwise strongly associated with Walsall.

Entertainment

Acting 

 Bobby Ash (1925–2007), British-Canadian actor born in Walsall
 Zoe Dawson (born 1979 in Walsall) actress, minor roles in the BBC soap opera Doctors
 Don Gilet (born 1967 in Caldmore) actor, roles in BBC productions Babyfather, EastEnders and 55 Degrees North.
 Jeffrey Holland (born Jeffrey Michael Parkes, 1946 in Walsall) actor, roles in TV sitcoms and in Hi-de-Hi!, attended Queen Mary's Grammar School.
 Matthew Marsden (born 1973 in West Bromwich) stage and film actor, brought up on the Yew Tree Estate in Walsall and schooled in Wednesbury and Great Barr.
 Peter McEnery (born 1940 in Walsall) stage TV and film actor. Gave Hayley Mills her first "grown-up" screen kiss in the 1964 film The Moon-Spinners.
 Sue Nicholls (born 1943 in Walsall) actress, played Audrey Roberts in Coronation Street.
 Erin O'Connor MBE (born 1978 in Brownhills) model and TV actress, attended Brownhills Community School
 Meera Syal CBE (born 1961) comedian, writer, playwright, singer, journalist, producer and actress. Brought up in Essington and attended Queen Mary's High School.
 Richard Wattis (born 1912 in Wednesbury – 1975), actor
 Frank Windsor (born 1927 in Walsall) actor, mainly on TV. Attended Queen Mary's Grammar School. Played DS John Watt in Z-Cars from 1962 to 1965.

Music 

 Amar (born 1982), British Indian singer
 Andy C (born 1976), DJ, record producer and co-founder of RAM Records
 Rob Collins (1963 in Rowley Regis – 1996) musician, original keyboardist of The Charlatans
 Martin Degville (born 1961 in Walsall) lead singer and co-songwriter of the UK pop band Sigue Sigue Sputnik.
 Goldie aka Clifford Joseph Price, MBE (born 1965 in Walsall) musician, DJ, graffiti artist, visual artist and actor, attended St. Francis of Assisi RC Secondary School in Aldridge
 Rob Halford (born 1951 in Sutton Coldfield) raised in Walsall, singer songwriter, lead vocalist for the heavy metal band Judas Priest.
 Noddy Holder MBE (born 1946 in Caldmore) musician and actor, lead singer and guitarist in glam rock band Slade
 Tom Major-Ball (1879 in Bloxwich – 1962) music hall and circus performer and father of John Major, former Prime Minister
 Frank Mullings (1881 in Walsall – 1953) a leading English tenor with Beecham Opera Company and its successor, the British National Opera Company
 Mark Rhodes (born 1981 in Darlaston) singer and TV presenter, finished 2nd in the 2nd series of Pop Idol, lives in Wombourne.
 Jorja Smith (born 1997 in Walsall) singer-songwriter
 Connie Talbot (born 2000) from Streetly, teen singer 2nd place in the first series of Britain's Got Talent (series 1)
 Kathryn Tickell OBE, DL (born 8 June 1967 in Walsall) is an English musician, noted for her mastery of the Northumbrian smallpipes and fiddle.
 Dave Walker (born 1945 in Walsall) singer and guitarist, front-man for a number of bands; including Idle Race, Savoy Brown, Fleetwood Mac, and, briefly, Black Sabbath.

TV and radio 
 Alex Lester (born 1956 in Walsall) radio broadcaster,
 Andrew Peach (born in Bloxwich c. 1970) BBC Radio presenter
 Bob Warman (born 1946) TV presenter,
 Leila Williams (born in Walsall 1937) beauty queen and Blue Peter presenter from 1958 until 1962

Politics 

 William Dixon Allott, (1817–1892) born in Walsall, Mayor of Adelaide 1873–1874
 David Ennals, Baron Ennals PC (1922–1995) Labour Party politician born in Walsall
 Bruce George (born 1942) Labour Party politician, MP for Walsall South 1974–2010
 Eddie Hughes (born 1968) Conservative Party politician, MP for Walsall North 2017 to date.
 Joseph Leckie (Born Glasgow 24 May 1866 – 9 August 1938) after whom Joseph Leckie school, now an academy was named. MP for Walsall 1931 - 1938.
 Sir Harmar Nicholls (1912 in Walsall – 2000) Conservative Party politician, MP for Peterborough 1950–1974.
 John Stonehouse (1925 – 1988) Labour Party politician, MP for Walsall North 1974–1976, notable for his unsuccessful attempt to fake his own death in 1974
 David Winnick (born 1933) Labour Party politician, MP for Walsall North 1979–2017.
 Jenny Tonge, Baroness Tonge MD (born 1941 in Walsall) politician, Liberal Democrat MP for Richmond Park in London 1997–2005,  made a life peer in June 2005.
 Valerie Vaz (born 1954) Labour politician and solicitor MP for Walsall South 2010 to date.

Public service and commerce 

 Francis Asbury (1745 Hamstead Bridge – 1816) joint founder of the Methodist movement in the United States, brought up in Gt Barr, emigrated 1771
 Mike Ashley (born 1964), British billionaire retail entrepreneur focused in the sporting goods market
 Sir Terence Beckett KBE (1923 in Walsall – 2013) businessman, chairman of Ford and later, director-general of the Confederation of British Industry
 Margaret Bromhall (born 1890 in Walsall) first radiotherapist appointed to a radiotherapy department, at North Middlesex Hospital in London
 John Henry Carless VC (1896 in Walsall – 1917) recipient of the Victoria Cross during the First World War
 Rev Harry Moore Dauncey (1863 in Walsall – 1932) missionary in Papua New Guinea
 Sister Dora (1832–1878) Anglican nun and a nurse in Walsall. She is honoured for her compassion and her medical work by a statue in the centre of town.
 Michael L. Fitzgerald (born Walsall in 1937) Roman Catholic Cardinal, expert on Muslim-Christian relations
 Martin Fowler (born 1963 in Walsall) software developer
 Frederick Gibbs MC (born 1899 in Walsall) World War I Flying Ace
 Sir Harry Hinsley OBE (1918 in Birchills – 1998) historian and cryptanalyst, worked at Bletchley Park and became Master of St John's College, Cambridge University
 Sir Len Peach (1932 in Walsall – 2016) Chief Executive of the National Health Service 1986 – 1989.
 Air Vice-Marshal Sidney Webster CBE AFC (1900 in Walsall – 1984) aviator and senior officer in the RAF

Sport 

 Norman Ashe (born 1943), footballer
 Fred Bakewell (1908 in Walsall – 1983) was a Northamptonshire and England opening batsman, renowned largely because of his unorthodox methods
 David Brown (born 1942 in Walsall) former English cricketer, attended Queen Mary's Grammar School played in twenty six Tests from 1965 to 1969
 Colin Charvis (born 1972 in Sutton Coldfield) attended Queen Mary's Grammar School in Walsall, a former captain of the Wales national rugby union team
 Leon Drysdale (born 1991), footballer
 Nick Gillingham MBE (born 1967 in Walsall) swimmer, competed in the 1988 Summer Olympics in Seoul and the 1992 Summer Olympics in Barcelona
 Terry Holbrook (born 1945 in Walsall) football referee formerly in the Football League and Premier League
 Dean Keates (born 1978 in Beechdale) retired footballer and former First Team manager of Walsall.
 Vaughan Lee (born 1982) Mixed Martial Artist formerly competing in UFC.
 Mark Lewis-Francis MBE (born Darlason 1982) 100 metres sprinter, member of the gold medal winning 4x100 metres relay team at the 2004 summer Olympics.
 Robert Marshall (1869–1937), cricketer
 Rupert Moon former Llanelli and Welsh rugby international, known as the "Walsall Welshman" he became a radio and television presenter in Wales.
 Lee Naylor (born in 1980 in Mossley) former professional footballer
 David Platt (born Walsall 1966) English-born Australian darts player
 Rachel Unitt  (born 1982 in Bentley) England Women's footballer
 Eleanor Simmonds OBE (born Walsall 1994) Paralympian swimmer, won gold in the 2008 and 2012 Summer Paralympics.

Writing 

 John Byrne (born 1950 in Walsall) comic book creator, raised in West Bromwich
 Peter Corey (born 1946 in Walsall) author of the Coping With children's book series also a TV actor.
 Jerome K. Jerome (1859 in Caldmore – 1927) writer   and humourist, author of comic travelogue Three Men in a Boat (1889).
 Paul McDonald (born 1961 in Walsall) comic novelist and academic.
 Sir Henry Newbolt CH (1862 in Bilston – 1938) poet, novelist and historian and old boy of Queen Mary's Grammar School.
 Nick Redfern (born 1964 in Pelsall) author and UFO researcher

Science 
 Lindon Eaves (1944–2022) geneticist and Anglican priest, born in Walsall
 John Edward Gray (1800–1875), zoologist, born in Walsall.

Murderers 
 Raymond Morris (1929 in Walsall – 2014) convicted of the Cannock Chase murders in the late 1960s, served 45 years in prison.
 Louise Porton (born 1996) woman who murdered her two children in 2018, formerly lived in Walsall

References 

Walsall